The Jabez Howland House is a historic house at 33 Sandwich Street in Plymouth, Massachusetts.

The oldest portion of this two-story wood-frame house was built by Jacob Mitchell (son of Pilgrim Experience Mitchell) in 1667, and purchased by Jabez Howland, son of Mayflower passengers John Howland and Elizabeth Tilley Howland, two of the original Pilgrims. The Jabez Howland House was owned as a private residence until 1915. Extensive restoration of the property took place in the 1940s to return it to its 17th-century appearance. The house was added to the National Register of Historic Places in 1974.

The Pilgrim John Howland Society owns and operates the house as a historic house museum that has been restored and decorated with 17th-century period furnishings.  The house is open for tours from mid-June through the end of October.

See also
National Register of Historic Places listings in Plymouth County, Massachusetts
List of the oldest buildings in Massachusetts

References

External links

Jabez Howland House - Pilgrim John Howland Society

Houses completed in 1667
Historic house museums in Massachusetts
Museums in Plymouth, Massachusetts
Houses in Plymouth, Massachusetts
National Register of Historic Places in Plymouth County, Massachusetts
1667 establishments in Massachusetts
Houses on the National Register of Historic Places in Plymouth County, Massachusetts